Interleukin 5 receptor, alpha (IL5RA) also known as CD125 (Cluster of Differentiation 125) is a subunit of the Interleukin-5 receptor. IL5RA also denotes its human gene.

Function 

The protein encoded by this gene is an interleukin 5 specific subunit of a heterodimeric cytokine receptor. The receptor is composed of a ligand specific alpha subunit and a signal transducing beta subunit shared by the receptors for interleukin 3 (IL3), colony stimulating factor 2 (CSF2/GM-CSF), and interleukin 5 (IL5). The binding of this protein to IL5 depends on the beta subunit. The beta subunit is activated by the ligand binding, and is required for the biological activities of IL5. This protein has been found to interact with syndecan binding protein (syntenin), which is required for IL5 mediated activation of the transcription factor SOX4. Six alternatively spliced transcript variants encoding three distinct isoforms have been reported.

Interactions 

Interleukin 5 receptor alpha subunit has been shown to interact with:
 Interleukin 5, 
 Janus kinase 2,
 Protein unc-119 homolog,  and
 SDCBP

See also 
 Cluster of differentiation
 Benralizumab
 Mepolizumab
 Reslizumab

References

Further reading

External links 
 
 

Clusters of differentiation